Cyan is the tenth album by American rock band Three Dog Night, released in 1973. The album's original working title was "Seven Ball, Center Pocket", which was changed for unknown reasons.

Track listing

Side 1
"Happy Song" (Mike Allsup) – 3:37
"Play Children Play" (Kent Sprague, Gary Stovall) – 4:10
"Storybook Feeling" (Allsup) – 4:20
"Ridin' Thumb" (James Seals) – 4:09

Side 2
"Shambala" (Daniel Moore) – 3:23
"Singer Man" (Cebert Bernard, Derrick Harriott) – 3:28
"Let Me Serenade You" (John Finley) – 3:15
"Lay Me Down Easy" (Moore) – 3:54
"Into My Life" (Allsup) – 4:33

Personnel

Musicians
Mike Allsup – guitar
Gordon DeWitty – organ (track B3)
Jimmy Greenspoon – keyboard
Danny Hutton – lead vocals (B4), background vocals
Chuck Negron – lead vocals (A1, A3, B2, B5), background vocals
Jack Ryland – bass
Floyd Sneed – drums
Cory Wells – lead vocals (tracks A2, A4, B1, B3), background vocals
Donna Gaines – additional background vocals

Production
Producer: Richard Podolor
Engineer: Bill Cooper
Arranger: Richard Podolor, Three Dog Night
Art direction: Ed Caraeff
Design: David Larkham, Michael Ross
Photography: Ed Caraeff

Charts
Album – Billboard (United States) 

Singles – Billboard (United States) unless otherwise noted

Certifications

References

1973 albums
Three Dog Night albums
Albums produced by Richard Podolor
Dunhill Records albums